Oxymirus cursor is the species of the Lepturinae subfamily in long-horned beetle family. This beetle is distributed in Austria, Belgium, Bulgaria, Croatia, Czech Republic, Denmark, Finland, France, Germany, Hungary, Italy, Luxembourg, Norway, Pakistan, Poland, Romania, Russia, Serbia, Slovakia, Slovenia, Spain, Sweden, and in Switzerland. Adult beetle feeds on European larch, silver fir, and Norway spruce.

Subtaxons 
There are three varietets in species:
 Oxymirus cursor var. lineatus Letzner, 1885 
 Oxymirus cursor var. nigrinus Reitter, 1905 
 Oxymirus cursor var. verneuili Mulsant, 1838

References

Lepturinae
Beetles described in 1758
Taxa named by Carl Linnaeus